Edward Potts McCurdy (January 11, 1919 – March 23, 2000) was an American folk singer, songwriter, and television actor. His most well-known song was the anti-war "Last Night I Had the Strangest Dream", written in 1950.

Career

Born to a farming family in Willow Hill, Pennsylvania, McCurdy left home at 18 to pursue a singing career. He first found success in 1938 as a singer and disc jockey at a gospel radio station in Oklahoma. By the early 1940s, McCurdy had become a popular singer of romantic songs in nightclubs across North America, until vaudeville dancer Sally Rand caught his act, hired him to join her show, put him in a tuxedo, and had him sing his romantic songs to her on stage while pushing her on her swing.

He stayed in vaudeville for several years as a singer and straight man to comedian (Fat) Jack E. Leonard, before moving in 1948, with his Canadian dancer wife and family, to Vancouver where he hosted his own radio show for CBC Radio. With the success of this show, the CBC transferred him to the flagship national station in Toronto where he starred in a morning children's show and an adult evening show. During his Canadian radio period, he developed friendships with the guests on his show, such as Pete Seeger, Lena Horne, Josh White, Oscar Peterson, and Oscar Brand. He developed a love for folk music and released his first folk album in 1949.

After achieving success with his folk show at New York's Village Vanguard in 1950, McCurdy and his family moved to New York City, from where he went on to become one of the world's best-known folk singers. He also became the "L&M Cigarette Man" on television, was an emcee for the George Gobel Show (national TV), and by 1956, was star of the children's TV show Freddie The Fireman.

He recorded many albums in the 1950s and 1960s for Elektra Records and Tradition Records, performed several times at the Newport Folk Festival, and was a well-known folk music artist throughout the 1950s and early 1960s, developing friendships with the younger folk set of Odetta, Bob Gibson, Erik Darling, Ramblin' Jack Elliott, and Josh White, Jr.

His widely covered anti-war song, "Last Night I Had the Strangest Dream", has been recorded in seventy-six languages (including covers by The Weavers in 1960, the Chad Mitchell Trio in 1962, Simon & Garfunkel in 1964, Cornelis Vreeswijk in 1964 (in Swedish), Hannes Wader in 1979 (in German), Johnny Cash in 2003, Garth Brooks in 2005, Serena Ryder in 2006, and Charles Lloyd in 2016). The melody is included in Francesco de Gregori's "Via della poverta".

In November 1989, as Tom Brokaw stood on top of the Berlin Wall, he directed his NBC-TV cameras towards the school children on the East German side of the Berlin Wall, to show the children singing "Last Night I Had the Strangest Dream" en masse as the wall was being dismantled.

His collection of risqué Elizabethan folk songs in a three-part series of albums titled When Dalliance was in Flower (and Maidens Lost Their Heads), became a favorite record series on college campuses. The actor Alan Arkin played with him on these recordings. His single "Miracle of the Wheat" released on Kapp Records in 1956 became a Christmas Tradition on Cincinnati Radio, played annually on WKRC-AM by broadcaster Stan Matlock.

By the late 1960s, McCurdy was forced to retire with health problems. In 1980, two of his compositions, "Last Night I Had the Strangest Dream" and "King's Highway", as recorded by his old friend Josh White, Jr., became the official theme songs for the Peace Corps and VISTA, respectively.

In the mid 1980s, he and his wife Beryl moved to Nova Scotia, where he enjoyed a second career as a character actor on Canadian television.

He was awarded the Peace Abbey Courage of Conscience award September 26, 1992 for "Last Night I Had the Strangest Dream".

Discography
1949: Sings Canadian Folksongs (Manhattan)
1955: Sings Folk Songs of The Canadian Maritimes (Whitehall Records)
1955: Badmen, Heroes, and Pirate Songs (Elektra Records)
1955: Sin Songs Pro & Con (Elektra EKL 124)
1955: The Ballad Record (Riverside Records)
1956: The Miracle of the Wheat (single - Kapp Records)
1956: Blood Booze 'n Bones (Elektra)
1956: Bar Room Ballads (Riverside)
195(?): Let's Sing Out (Capri 507) Canada
1956: The Folk Singer (Dawn Records)
1956: A Ballad Singer's Choice (Tradition Records, Empire Musicwerks)
1956: When Dalliance Was In Flower (and Maidens Lost Their Heads) vol. 1 (Elektra)
1957: Sin Songs — Pro and Con (Elektra)
1957: Songs of the Old West (Elektra)
195(?): "Songs I Learned Coming Thru The Great Smokies" (FolkArt FLP 5001)
1958: When Dalliance Was In Flower (and Maidens Lost Their Heads) vol. 2 (Elektra)
1958: When Dalliance Was In Flower (and Maidens Lost Their Heads) vol. 3 (Elektra)
1958: Children's Songs (Tradition Records)
1959: Son of Dalliance (Elektra)
1959: Children's Songs and Stories (Folkways Records)
1961: A Treasure Chest Of American Folk Song Double LP (Elektra)
1962: Folk Songs (Coronet)
1963: The Best of Dalliance (Elektra)
1971: Songs of the West (Tradition/Everest TR 2061)'
1976: "Last Night I Had The Strangest Dream" (Bear Family Records) Germany
1977: On Jordan's Stormy Banks I Stand: Sacred Songs of America with Dana McCurdy (Folkways Records)
1980: Songs and Stories (Folkways Records)
1996: Cowboy Songs (Tradition Records)
1996: Naughty & Bawdy Songs of Olde England (Warner Bros. Records)The Legend of Robin Hood (Riverside)American Folk Songs (Spoken Arts)A Child's Introduction to American Folk Songs (Spoken Arts)Sings Folksongs Of The Sea (Tiara Spotlight Series - TST 537)
2019: Cowboy & Western Songs'' (BACM)

See also
Wit and Mirth, or Pills to Purge Melancholy

References

External links
Lyrics for "Last Night I Had the Strangest Dream"
Discography on Folkways
Ed McCurdy / Ed's Place - Canadian Communication Foundation
Elektra Records discography
 

1919 births
2000 deaths
American folk singers
American male singer-songwriters
American singer-songwriters
Fast Folk artists
Elektra Records artists
Tradition Records artists
Transatlantic Records artists
20th-century American singers
20th-century American male singers